Albert "Al, Rusty" Hughes (May 13, 1899 – November 7, 1969) was a Canadian professional ice hockey player who played 60 games in the National Hockey League during the 1930–31 and 1931–32 seasons with the New York Americans. The rest of his career, which lasted from 1922 to 1934, was spent in various minor leagues. Hughes was born in Guelph, Ontario.

He died at a Collingwood hospital in 1969.

Career statistics

Regular season and playoffs

References

External links
 

1899 births
1969 deaths
Canadian ice hockey left wingers
Ice hockey people from Ontario
New Haven Eagles players
New York Americans players
Niagara Falls Cataracts players
Ontario Hockey Association Senior A League (1890–1979) players
St. Louis Flyers (AHA) players
Sportspeople from Guelph
United States Amateur Hockey Association players